The Biggest Loser: Special Edition is a special edition of the NBC reality television series The Biggest Loser.  The special edition debuted on January 4, 2006.

Synopsis
In contrast to the regular series, the special edition typically consists of teams who already know each other, rather than strangers. The show is hosted by comedian Caroline Rhea with Bob Harper and Jillian Michaels as the two personal trainers.

Instead of spending months at the ranch and then continuing to lose more weight at home, the special edition contestants are only spending 11 days at the ranch and then returning home for "several" months. At the end, all the contestants come back to be weighed for the final time and one team will ultimately be declared the "Biggest Loser(s)."

Episodes

Episode 1

The Muha Family vs. The Samuels Family
 Red team working with Jillian: Otto Muha, Erica Muha, and Shaun Muha
 Blue team working with Bob: Don Samuels, Melony Samuels, and Ravee Samuels
 The Muha family wins the ice cream challenge and wins a computer, digital camera, and printer.
 The Muha family wins the pop quiz and wins a $2,500 shopping spree.
 By winning the weigh-in at the ranch, the Samuels family wins a 5-day trip to a spa.
 The Muha family wins the final weigh-in and $50,000 cash.

Episode 2

Engaged Couple vs. Engaged Couple
 Red team working with Jillian: Steve Rothermel and Sarah Eberwein
 Blue team working with Bob: Edwin Chapman and Rasha Spindel
 Steve & Sarah Win Limo Challenge winning $5000 and a chef for a week.
 Steve & Sarah Win first weight-in losing 55 lb lost total to the Blue Teams 41 lb. Winning a Honeymoon trip to Jamaica.
 Steve & Sarah Wins Final Weigh-in losing 170 lb total to the Blue Teams 133 lb. Winning $50,000 for a Dream Wedding.

Episode 3

The Senti Family (50s Diner) vs. The Sapienzas Family (Little Italy)
 Red team working with Jillian: Alexa Sapienza, Toni Sapienza, Robert Sapienza, and Daniela Sapienza
 Blue team working with Bob: Scott Senti, Tammy Senti, Kelly Wilcox, and Emily Senti
 The Senti family wins the Treadmill Challenge and is able to work out with Bob for an additional week.
 By winning the weigh-in at the ranch, the Senti family wins a vacation to a resort.
 The Senti family wins the final weigh in and $50,000.

Episode 4

Engaged Couple vs. Engaged Couple
 Red team working with Jillian: Bruce and Kimberly
 Blue team working with Bob: Nick and Lael
 Bruce & Kimberly win the Temptation Challenge, and as a result they win a video camera.
 Nick & Lael win the Wedding Cake Challenge, and as a result they win a personal chef for a month.
 Nick & Lael win first weight-in losing 44 lb lost total to the Read Teams 37 lb, and as a result they won a honeymoon trip to Jamaica.
 Bruce & Kimberly win the Final Weigh-in losing 154 lb total to the Blue Teams 111 lb. Winning $50,000 for a Dream Wedding.

Episode 5

Marine Wives vs Navy Wives
 Red team working with Jillian: Amanda, Amber, Rosalina, Sharon
 Blue team working with Bob: Dari, Jessica, Tami and Tina
 Neither team competed in the Temptation Challenge. Nobody won because it's a tie.
 The Marine wives win the Military Challenge.
 By winning the weigh-in at the ranch, the Navy wives win an extra week of training with Bob prior to the final weigh in
 The Navy Wives win the final weigh in and $50,000.

Episode 6

Tofannelis vs Stephens
 Red team working with Jillian: Amy, Sue, Steve, and Tony
 Blue team working with Bob: Al, Amelia, Anita, and Ashley
 Both teams competed in the Temptation Challenge. Red Team won $1,000 and a laptop.
 The Red Team won the Challenge, along with four mountain bikes.
 By winning the weigh-in at the ranch, the Red team got a vacation.
 The Red Team won the final weigh in and $50,000.
 This episode never aired on NBC in the USA.  It was available online only, and then aired on Style.

References

External links
 NBC: The Biggest Loser
 Jillian Michaels Online

Special Edition
2006 American television seasons
2006 in American television
2006 American television series debuts
American television spin-offs
Reality television spin-offs